14 DAYS is a 2014 American science fiction experimental film, written and directed by Joseph Villapaz. It stars Emily Dennis and Michael Wetherbee and takes place in New York City. It has screened at the Alhambra Theatre Film Festival, Motor City Nightmares, NewFilmmakers Spring Screening Series and at the New Jersey Film Festival. It received 4th Place in the Best Sci-Fi Short Film category at the 2015 International Horror Hotel film festival and an honorable mention in the Best Feature Film category at the Los Angeles Film Review Independent Film Awards.

Plot 
Consisting of a variety of short stories tied together by a larger plot, each segment introduces an issue that the characters deal with. All scenes take place in one location and the audiences view is of the park bench and its immediate area. However, there are some exceptions such as the scene where the thief runs through the city, eventually arriving in the park. There are breaks between days, simulating that nothing interesting happens on some days. The days are titled on screen to indicate a passage of time. Without this, the scenes would appear to occur on the same day because the weather and time of day don't appear to change. However, for scenes that occur right after the previous one, the title is omitted as for scenes for Day 11 - Sisters and Day 13 - Closure.

Day 1 - Coffee
Josh meets Lita in the park. She appears to be troubled by something so he offers her a cup of coffee to help ease her stress. They engage in a humorous conversation but a paging signal on Lita's phone ruins the atmosphere and the two head off immediately to the destination mentioned in the page.

Day 3 - Moving On
June is on a train holding a red rose but she becomes distressed when its leaves fall apart. She arrives in the park to meet her husband, Michael. They talk about their children, June's sister's relationships and eventually their own. Michael urges June to move on with her life and put his tragic death behind her. They embrace and have a passionate kiss. Before June leaves, Michael gives her a rose then fades away. As presented, one could speculate that the scene could play out in an infinite loop since June had a rose in the beginning and at the end, in a way representing her failing to break the cycle and move on with her life.

Day 5 - Family
Trix joins Carmidy for lunch. They enjoy some conversation before Carmidy reveals her desire to have children with her former boyfriend. Trix, all too eager for Carmidy to move forward, agrees then they leave to return to work.

Day 7 - Choice
Lita and Josh appear again, this time next to a river in the city. After some humorous discussion about pets, Josh reveals that he submitted a request for transfer to a team that specializes in investigating strange and unusual events. Lita becomes visibly and verbally distraught before the paging signal on Josh's phone interrupts and the two go to the scene.

Day 9 - Siblings
Hope meets brother Destin in the park for an annual family get together. Their brother, Moff, arrives a few minutes later after Hope and Destin talk about his childish past. After being out of touch for a year, each has undergone significant changes. Moff and Destin express their happiness at Hope's slimmer figure, Destin says he's finishing up medical school and Moff is engaged. Moff has apparently become more mature with his childish antics behind him. However, after Destin talks about how proud he was of Moff defending him when others taunted him about being adopted, Hope reveals that after doing some research, she discovered that she was also adopted.

Day 11 - The Hidden
Zenia, an Obsidian from The Magnate civilization, is held captive in a dark room interrogated by an unknown and unseen being. Only its deep ominous voice is heard. What appears to be a spotlight is directed at Zenia's face. However, the light isn't completely stationary so perhaps it is illuminated from the interrogator. Zenia is questioned about her mission on Earth. She explains that she and Essix were sent to "pacify" the terrorist threat by killing them and destroying their arsenal of weapons. In doing so, they discovered residual energy from weapons made by their enemy, The Quaazen, but don't know how humans acquired alien technology originating from a distant galaxy. Recovering from injuries from her fight with the terrorists, Zenia quickly materializes away from her captors.

Day 11 - Sisters
Some time later, another Obsidian is in the park where Zenia and Essex were captured. Her superior, The Overseer, materializes and confirms Zenia and Essix's safe return but is concerned why she is still on Earth. The Obsidian explains she is investigating how the humans may have gotten Quaazen weapons and expresses her longing to return home. The Overseer acknowledges how The Obsidian's personality is like their mother's and The Obsidian acknowledges how The Overseer's personality is like their father's. This leads to concern of a greater threat than the Quaazen, The Reapers, trans-dimensional beings whose only goal is to harvest all forms of energy.

Day 13 - Thief
A man cautiously runs through the city streets constantly looking around if he is being followed. He stops in a secluded area of the park and begins to look through a bag he has just stolen. Finding cash, a wallet and a cellphone, he plays a voicemail on the phone. The voicemail is by a man to his wife apologizing for his short temper and explains what he is doing to solve his problem. At the conclusion of the voicemail, the thief becomes conflicted with guilt, pushes the bag and its contents to the side then walks aways without taking anything. Throughout the scene, the thief is never seen speaking. The only voice is from the voicemail coming from the cellphone's speaker. The viewer is left wondering if the voice on the phone was probably the thief's conscience all along.

Day 13 - Closure
Lita and Josh traced the stolen bag to the park where the thief left it. It seems when the thief retrieved the voicemail, it triggered something which could be traced. Lita tries to explain this but Josh disagrees. Lita returns playful remarks then suddenly embraces Josh and gives him a passionate kiss. Lita says "YES" but Josh is confused. Lita reminds him of the dream he told her many times about proposing on the Spanish Steps in Italy, but didn't when they actually were on vacation there. This was enough for Josh to pull out the engagement ring from his pocket and confesses waiting for the right moment and puts it on Lita's finger. Both relieved, they hug and kiss then Lita's phone rings. Instead of another call to investigate another crime, it's a text from Lita's mother saying her phone was on and she heard the whole proposal. Josh picks up his phone reading a message that Lita's parents called his parents about the news. Thinking that all surprises have been revealed, Lita briefly mentions a baby shower in a comment peaking Josh's curiosity. The viewer is left wondering if Lita was distressed in the beginning because she was pregnant but not married to Josh or maybe she was just hinting at wanting to be.

Day 14 - Scouts
Two alien scouts from a race formally a part of The Magnate civilization, materialize in the park. The leader, Onyx, after observing human relationships over the past 14 days, expresses disappointment that humans are perhaps weak by constantly engaging in trivial conflicts. Saph, on the other hand, believes their good qualities is actually a strength that is worth considering. Onyx describes The Reaper threat in detail. The scene ends from the opposite view for the first time showing Onyx and Saph in the foreground and the cityscape in the background.

Bonus Scene - Subversive
On February 28, 2016, a 12-minute film titled, Subversive, screened at the Anthology Film Festival in New York City. Not a part of the "Day" scenes, Subversive blurs the line between reality and fiction and can be viewed without ever having seen 14 Days. A talk show host interviews the director of 14 Days, portrayed by a woman, while the real-life director, Joseph Villapaz, makes a cameo appearance as an on-set producer. This starts off "normally" but suddenly turns darker with an edgy sci-fi and horror tone. The film has since been added to 14 Days, however, it has also been submitted to film festivals as a separate short film and selected to the Prelude2Cinema Presents Film Festival, Women's Only Entertainment Film Festival and Los Angeles CineFest.

On June 12, 2016, Subversive will be screening at the International Horror Hotel Film Festival. It has also been awarded an Honorable Mention.

Reception 

Reviewer Carl Burgess of ScreenCritix, pointed out budget limitations but still said it was "watchable and entertaining". However, reviewer Misty Layne of Rogue Cinema was very positive of the film concluding "good actors and a good story make for a fine film".

Awards and Selections [14 Days] 
14 DAYS has received the following recognitions:

Awards and Selections [Subversive] 
SUBVERSIVE has received the following recognitions:

References

External links 

 
 

Films set in London
Films set in Sheffield
2010s English-language films